is a six-volume manga series by Yuu Watase, first serialized in Shōjo Comic. Chuang Yi licensed it for an English language release in Singapore, with the first volume released in March 2005. Viz Media licensed the series for an English release in North America, serializing the series in its Shojo Beat manga anthology as well as releasing the volumes.

The manga series was adapted into an 11-episode live-action drama series that aired in Japan in 2008. A 13-episode Taiwanese adaption (絕對達令 Jue Dui Darling) aired in 2012, and a 40-episode South Korean adaptation aired in 2019 under the title My Absolute Boyfriend.

Plot 
Riiko Izawa has never had a boyfriend and she has been rejected by every boy she has ever had a crush on. When she returns a lost cell phone to an oddly dressed salesman, she mentions wanting a boyfriend. To thank her, he directs her to his company's website, Kronos Heaven. When she visits the site, Riiko finds it's a site to create your perfect lover. Thinking it's a game, she customizes and accidentally orders one. The next day, her new lover arrives. Following the instruction manual, she kisses him to wake him up, which configures him to be in love with only her. She names him "Night". Three days later, she is shocked to learn that she only had him for a free trial for 72 hours. The salesman, Gaku Namikiri, tells her that she must now pay  for Night, however, they will waive the fee if she helps them to collect data about how women think and feel to help perfect future models.

Riiko must now keep Night's true nature a secret from everyone around her. She also soon finds herself in a love triangle between Night and her childhood friend Soshi, who declares his love for her out of fear he will lose her. As the series progresses, Night begins to develop real human emotions, enabling him to truly love Riiko but also resulting in system malfunctions. When Riiko almost loses Night due to the malfunctions, she realizes that he is the one she really loves. She apologizes to Soshi, who moves to Spain with his brother to live with their dad. Night and Riiko spend a few happy weeks together, during which they go on dates, get their picture taken together, and purchase matching rings as symbols of their undying love.

As the series ends, Night begins to grow sleepier and sleepier. The problems developed by him exceeding his abilities eventually causes his machinery to stop working, resulting in his "death". Before he died, he wrote a letter directed to Soshi telling him what was happening and asking him to take care of Riiko. He also sends his ring, which Riiko noticed he has not been wearing immediately prior to his death. In the letter, he tells Riiko that she doesn't have to cry for him any more but to always smile. So she laughs and forever treasures her rings and memories of Night.

Characters 

Played by: Mokomichi Hayami (Japan)
Nightly 01 (Night) is a cybernetic doll ordered by Riiko Izawa. As such, he is the "perfect boyfriend": charming, dependable, intelligent, athletic, good-looking, sensitive, and completely devoted. Designed to fulfill intimate relations for a woman, Night constantly offers to have sex with Riiko, who steadfastly declines the offer. Not knowing a sense of privacy, he often takes off his clothes under the slightest prompting of him having to sleep with Riiko even at public places, and often tries to hug or kiss Riiko, which makes her uncomfortable and embarrassed. 
While Night at first functions as Riiko's perfect boyfriend due to his programming, his relationship with Riiko eventually makes him develop true humanlike emotions, culminating in him having his own will. Even if Night's allegiance to Riiko can be switched by means of kissing, his relationship with her is so strong that when a customer of a host club makes him her lover, he still remembers Riiko, albeit as an ex-girlfriend; upon kissing Riiko again, he quickly switches allegiance to her while completely forgetting his experiences with the customer beforehand. Eventually, he grows to love Riiko genuinely and trespasses orders given to him by Kronos Heaven. 
However, Night is secretly dying from battery failure as his relationship with Riiko goes intimate, although he does not want to make Riiko worry by informing her. Before he shuts down, he writes a letter for Soushi to return for Riiko, while telling Riiko not to cry and to move on from him.
Night's Ring
Functions similarly to a mood ring, with one difference: it reads the moods of people around Night. This helps him collect data about interacting with them.
What the different colors mean: Red - Happy, Pink - Pleasure, Black - Sad, Blue - Angry and Jealous, and White - Neutral/Calm.
In the Japanese series, his data-collecting equipment is a bracelet instead of a ring.
In the Taiwanese series, an additional color, yellow, is added, which can be generated when Night has a sex drive.
In the South Korean series, Da-da wears the ring instead of Young-gu. It has only two colors: Red for happy or love, and black for angry or sad.
Live-action
In the Japanese series, Night is initially much more annoying than his manga incarnation as he often embarrasses Riiko by telling everyone that he is her "ideal boyfriend", which infuriates her. He finds a job as a janitor at Asamoto and embarrasses her further.
By developing his own will, Kronos Heaven worries about the problems he may cause to the company and they try to delete his data. Though Night manages to keep his system from deletion for some time, his data chip begins to overheat due to his newfound independence and eventually stops working altogether.
In the special episode in Japan, his system is restored by a doctor who wishes to use his independence for her selfish reasons. He eventually is forced to make the ultimate decision: to give up Riiko for her future.

Played by: Saki Aibu
Riiko is a young, flat-chested (according to Soushi, 32-A cup) 16-year-old girl who has bad luck with boys. When she helps a strange salesman named Gaku Namikiri, she ends up ordering a cybernetic boyfriend. Though initially shy around her new boyfriend, Riiko begins to fall in love with him, while also finding herself struggling with her new admirer, Soushi Asamoto. Riiko is rather naïve, clumsy, and simple-minded, but kindhearted, hardworking, and serious.
Riiko doesn't want to admit she is in love with Night and constantly reminds herself that he is just a doll. This, however, isn't completely true because she gets jealous or even angry when he flirts with other girls for "data."
Live-action
In the Japanese version, Riiko is an office lady at Asamoto who has trouble with guys,  so she is introduced by the manager of Kronos Heaven to try out a cybernetic boyfriend for one week. Over the course of the series, she grows increasingly attached to her new boyfriend, Night Tenjo, and her boss, Asamoto Soshi. She chooses to give up her dream of becoming a pâtissier to be with Night, but she ends up going anyway after Night's computer system is destroyed.
In the special episode in Japan, Riiko has become an official pâtissier after three years of training and is forced to make the choice of her life when Night is suddenly restored.

Played by: Hiro Mizushima
Soushi is Riiko's childhood friend. He lives alone with his brother because his father is a travel photographer. He watches over Riiko and takes care of her while her parents work far away. At first, he simply treats her as a very good friend. But as the story progresses, Soushi realizes that he has stronger feelings for Riiko and confesses his love to her.
Live-action
In the Japanese version, Soushi's personality is switched between that of his brother; instead of a serious individual, Soushi is a flamboyant and playful young man who cares more about the origins of his grandfather's company than what it has become. He grows romantically attached to Riiko and declares his love for her, who reciprocates her feelings. He also encourages Riiko to pursue her dream of becoming a pâtissier. At the end of the series, Soushi invites Riiko to study further in becoming a pâtissier at France with him. In the special episode, Soushi and Riiko return to Japan after three years of study to reopen the Asamoto's original base of home. The two have also become a couple, but their relationship is strained by the sudden return of Night. Eventually however, the two reconcile after Night decides to let go of his relationship with Riiko.

Played by: Kuranosuke Sasaki 
Gaku is a salesman for Kronos Heaven, a company specializing in making highly realistic robots, or "figures". Though usually businesslike and down-to-earth, Gaku is often mistaken for a cosplayer because of his odd manner of dress. When Riiko cannot return Night or pay the bill for him, Gaku allows her to keep him so Night can collect data on how to become a better lover for use in future models. Whenever there is a problem with Night, Gaku is the one to fix him. Gaku keeps close tabs on the progress in the relationship between Riiko and Night, and he often appears randomly out of nowhere, ie. out of Riiko's closet, mostly for comic relief. A stereotypical Japanese salesman, he speaks with a heavy Kansai dialect and tends to interject Spanish words in his conversations. Gaku's family owns a business of selling takoyaki; at the end of the series, Gaku quits his job at Kronos Heaven to inherit his family business. Gaku is the one whom Night trusts to give his letter asking Soushi to return for Riiko once the latter has calmed down from her grief of losing Night.
Live-action
In the Japanese drama, Namikiri is the creator of Nightly 01, and he decides to sell his 01 to Riiko to prove that his robot is ready for mass production. Like everyone in the series, Namikiri is depicted to be quite older than in the manga. Contrary to with his fellow employees' ideas at Kronos Heaven, he believes that Night developing humanlike emotions is a good thing and tries to defend him from being scrapped. At the end of the series, he stores the now-shut down Night while praising the latter for what he had done in his short life. In the special episode, Gaku expresses surprise when Night comes to function without his authorization. He later reluctantly scraps Night, as per the latter's wishes.

Played by: Natsuhi Ueno
A frenemy and classmate of Riiko, having been Riiko's friend since middle school. A beautiful and charming girl, she attracts the attention of many boys, whom she occasionally dates, if only briefly. She offers support and reassurance when Riiko feels miserable after being rejected by Ishizeki. However, later on, it is shown that she is the reason why boys always reject Riiko after she asks them out, as she has been spreading rumors around school that Riiko is slutty and goes out with boys for their money. Mika has been dating Ishizeki ever since Riiko takes interest in him and quickly breaks up with him once he has rejected Riiko's confession, as she is only interested in things that belong to other people. Later on, Mika sets Night's violent fanclub on Riiko and tries to make Night break up with Riiko and date her instead. In the end, her scheme backfires, and she stops being friends with Riiko.
Live-action
In the Japanese drama, Mika, as in the manga, starts out as Riiko's understanding friend who offers support for Riiko's love life. However, she is secretly jealous of Riiko's popularity and charm to attract many men. She has been trying her hardest to ruin Riiko's life, first by dating with Ishizeki when the latter is still being pursued by Riiko, and later by seducing Night with a kiss, which temporarily switches his allegiance to Mika until Riiko manages to kiss him back. She also secretly sends Natsumi, Riiko's competitor in a pastry competition, recipes that allow her to win. When her schemes are discovered, Mika is humiliated and quits her job at the office. She later reconciles with Riiko and helps to protect Night's secret.

Played by: Miki Maya (Japan)
An aloof friend of Riiko. Due to her antisocial attitude, Riiko and other students find Miyabe "weird". However, Miyabe is actually very kind and sometimes offers her deadpan advice about love for Riiko. She is the first to learn that Riiko has been lured to be humiliated by Night's crazed fanclub led by Mika during an outdoor trip; while she claims that it is not her problem, Miyabe tells Mika that her actions will yield consequences. Riiko later finds out that Miyabe is very rich due to having worked as a stock trader, which she has interest to take part on to pay Night's maintenance bills. Miyabe becomes the second person, after Soushi, to know that Night is in fact a robot, during her borrowing of a miniature Night. She reveals to Night that ever since her parents' deaths, she has lost her will to fall in love with anyone, although she is able to be convinced by Night to fall in love again.
Live-action
Fujiko is a bartender of the bar adjoining the Asamoto office building who smokes and is quite close to Riiko. Like Miyabe, Fujiko offers advice to Riiko about her troubled love life and is also the second person in the office, after Soushi, to discover that Night is a robot.

Played by: Eisuke Sasai
Gaku Namikiri's superior at Kronos Heaven, Yuki sends a Nightly 02 model, Toshiki, to seduce and have sex with Riiko, due to Night's repeated failure to sleep with Riiko. He at first pretends to be Toshiki's younger brother who knocks out Night by whispering a code to his ear so Toshiki can have a chance to seduce Riiko. He drops his disguise just before Night's inevitable fight with Toshiki, stating that whichever model that successfully sleeps with Riiko will be the finished product, while the failure one will be disposed. After Night wins the fight, Yuki shuts down Toshiki so it can be reprogrammed. However, when Night runs away from Kronos Heaven during his maintenance period, Yuki is sent alongside Gaku by his superiors to capture him, due to Night's possible danger as a doll with humanlike emotions. Despite his attempts to capture him, including sending another model of Nightly 01, he fails and is convinced by Gaku to give up the act.
Live-action
In the Taiwanese version, Baiqi (Yuki) is the COO of Kronos Heaven. He is the creator of the perfect lover robots. A child prodigy, he along with the founder of Kronos Heaven, created Nightly 01 based on the founder's son (which Xiaofei met briefly when she was young) who died in his twenties. He eventually helps Lei Wuwu help Zongshi in repairing Night.

Played by: Tsuyoshi Abe (Japan)
Another line of cybernetic dolls manufactured by Kronos Heaven in the same liege as Night, Toshiki is part of the Nightly 02 series, which is technologically more advanced than the Nightly 01 series. He carries a high resemblance to Night in facial features, body structure, and even wears the same jewelry, although he is much stronger and has better reflexes than him. During Night and Riiko's stay at a hotel, Toshiki manages to knock out Riiko upon kissing her, then claims that he had fun with her the next morning; while the two have not in fact slept together, Riiko believes so, and this temporarily creates a strain between her and Night. Toshiki uses the opportunity to seduce Riiko, but he is stopped by Night, who tears his arm after a brutal fight. Toshiki is then shut down by Yuki and taken away for testing and reprogramming. Later, he becomes the boyfriend of a wealthy girl and establishes a friendship with Riiko and Night.
Live-action
In the Japanese drama, Riiko encounters Toshiki sitting at a bench on the riverside when she is let down. Toshiki simply tries to get along with her staying at Riiko's landlady's house and starting working as a janitor as Night at her company. He locks Night up in a room to go out with Riiko, but his plan fails as Night escapes and confronts him at the parking lot. As Nightly 02, Toshiki is developed by another team at Kronos Heaven in the Japanese version. In the competition between Nightly 01 and 02, Toshiki loses as he calculates too much for his sake when Riiko is at the risk of a car accident while Night saves her without thinking of his own safety. As a result, Toshiki is disposed permanently and Night 01 is chosen for mass production.

Played by: Shunsuke Nakamura
Soushi's little brother. Like Soushi, Masaki is also a childhood friend of Riiko. He strongly supports his brother to date Riiko, much to Soushi's embarrassment. At the end of the series, alongside Soushi, Masaki moves to Spain to rejoin with his father and stays there permanently while Soushi decides to return to Japan six months later.
Live-action
In the Japanese TV series, Masaki, who is renamed as Masashi, is Soushi's older brother and takes up the characteristics of Soushi in the manga (having black hair, wearing glasses, etc.) as well as his personality. Serious and no-nonsense, he constantly criticizes and laments Soushi's immaturity and indifference when handling the family pastry business, of which he takes up the seat of vice-chairman. He also looks down on Riiko because of the latter's low social standing and general unprofessionalism in the job. As the series goes on, however, Masashi begins to admit that Soushi is able to take care of the business in his own ways, and at the end of the series, he approves of Soushi's appointment for Riiko to accompany him to France.

Played by: Nobuo Kyou
A boy whom Riiko has had a crush on since the school entrance. Riiko confesses her love for Ishizeki at the start of the series, but he rejects, saying that he is already in love with another girl. It is later revealed that the girl is in fact Riiko's friend, Mika, who breaks up with him in return and is the one who made him as well as every boy Riiko had tried to date believe that Riiko is a gold digger. Ishizeki harshly discusses his rejection to his friends, which Riiko (and unknowingly, Soushi) overhears, and later publicly humiliates Riiko; he receives his comeuppance when both Night and Soushi beat him up. Ishizeki then calls Riiko a "slut" upon knowing her relationship with Night; Night once again beats him and his friends while telling them never to mess with him or Riiko again.
Live-action
In the Japanese drama, Ishizeki is a staff member of Asamoto whom Riiko seems to be fond of until she realizes with some prompting from Mika that he has been playing with her feelings.
In the Taiwanese version, Shi Guan (Ishizeki) is one of Xiaofei's colleagues that she has a crush on. He turns down Xiaofei brutally in front of a group of his colleagues. Night shows up to protect Xiaofei and teach Shi Guan and his colleagues a lesson.
 and 
Played by: Ryou Iwamatsu and Hitomi Takahashi
Riiko's parents. The two work overseas and seldom return to Japan, forcing Riiko to live in an apartment by herself. In spite of their rare visits for their daughter, they, especially Yoshiharu, truly care for Riiko's well-being. They are first shown in a comedic segment when Riiko, in her initial shock of seeing Night arriving naked, reminiscences that she used to innocently ask her father about male genitalia when she was a child. The two return to Japan midway in the series and expresses surprise (in Yoshiharu's case, disapproval) that their daughter is living with a man. To try to shoo off Night, Yoshiharu attempts to make Riiko attend a dinner with Soushi, whom he particularly wants in becoming his son-in-law, though the plan falls through. The two remain unaware of Night's actual state as they take their leave from Japan. 
Live-action
In the Japanese drama, Yoshiharu and Makiko decide to visit Riiko during their business visit in Tokyo. When he discovers that Riiko is living with Night, Yoshiharu goes mad and strains his relationship with Riiko. However, with Night's insistence for them to take a vacation and later Night's determination to do anything for Riiko, Yoshiharu reconciles with his daughter right before he and his wife leave Tokyo. A running gag in the episode they appear in is that Makiko becomes flustered whenever she meets all "attractive men" who are close to Riiko, including Night, Soushi, and even Gaku.

Played by: Manbuku Kin
Riiko and Soushi's boss at a Vietnamese restaurant named "Manteiv". He has an odd appearance and speaks in a mangled English. It is later revealed that Muyai is in fact another manufactured robot of Kronos Heaven, tasked to capture Night after his escape from the company.

Media

Manga 
Written by Yuu Watase, Absolute Boyfriend premiered in Japan in the March 2003 issue of Shōjo Comic. It appeared monthly until the thirty-fifth and final chapter was published in the February 2005 issue. The chapters were published in six collected volumes by Shogakukan with the first volume released on October 25, 2003 and the final volume released on February 25, 2005.

Absolute Boyfriend is licensed for both English and Chinese releases in Singapore by Chuang Yi, which has released all six volumes of the series. Madman Entertainment subsequently imported and republished the Chuang Yi English translated volumes in Australia from May 17, 2006 through October 11, 2006.  In North America, the series was licensed for an English translated release by Viz Media. It was one of the first six manga series Viz included in the June 2005 premiere issue of the company's new manga anthology Shojo Beat. It continued to be serialized in Shojo Beat until it reached its conclusion in the March 2008 issue. Viz simultaneously released the six collected volumes of the series, with the first volume released February 7, 2006 and the final volume released on May 6, 2008.

The series is also licensed for regional language releases in Germany by Egmont Manga & Anime, in France by Kana, and in Brazil by Conrad.

Volume list

Drama CD 
A drama CD based on this manga was released under the title Zettai Kareshi - Figure Darling in Japan by Marine Entertainment on August 25, 2004.

Live-action television series

Japanese adaptation

A live-action adaptation of the manga began airing on Fuji TV on April 15, 2008 and ran for eleven episodes until its conclusion on June 24, 2008. In the live-action version, Riiko Izawa is an office lady in search of a boyfriend, and she ends up in possession of a "robot" known as Night Tenjo, who is programmed to be the perfect boyfriend. However, this creates a love triangle with a distinguished young man at her company who also has feelings for her. Riiko is played by Saki Aibu, Night is played by Mokomichi Hayami, and Soshi Asamoto is played by Hiro Mizushima.

On March 24, 2009, a special episode of this series was released and featured 3 years after the last episode of the series, whereas Riiko had become a pâtissier and is engaged to Soshi Asamoto; and Night was suddenly revived by a Kronos Heaven employee, who wanted to use his individual ego to her own gain. At the end of this special episode, Night is last seen telling Namikiri to erase him from this world while shedding tears. Riiko at last, returns to Soshi's side and their marriage goes on, but this is not shown on screen.

Taiwanese adaptation

It was announced at a press conference on October 5, 2010 that a live-action adaptation of Absolute Boyfriend will be filmed starring Taiwanese singer-actor Wu Chun as "Night" and Korean actress Ku Hye-sun as "Riiko." On May 3, 2011, Jiro Wang replaced fellow Fahrenheit band member Wu Chun as the male lead of the drama series, now titled Absolute Darling. The Taiwanese adaptation premiered on April 1, 2012 on FTV.(絕對達令 Jue Dui Da Ling).

Korean adaptation

On October 18, 2011, there were unconfirmed reports of a Korean adaptation titled Absolutely Him starring actress Kim Ha-neul as the female lead opposite singer-actor T.O.P. However, there are no follow-up news on the production.
On February 23, 2018, according to the online platform Naver and media news site Newsen, Korean cable network OCN is in talks to adapt the manga with "Romantic Comedy King" as its working title. On March 15, 2018, Song Ji Hyo and Chun Jung Myung were cast as leads. On April 10, 2018, Song Ji-hyo reportedly decline the role while Yeo Jin-goo is in talks and is taking consideration. On May 30, 2018, reports confirmed Yeo Jin-goo and Girl's Day Bang Min-ah as leads while Hong Jong-hyun is still in talks. Their first script reading was held on June 22, 2018 and filming began in July. The drama will be written by Yang Hyuk-moon (Secret Healer) and will be directed by Jung Jung-hwa with no confirmed broadcasting station and air date just yet. The drama finished filming in December 2018 and is currently airing on SBS from May 2019.

References

Further reading

External links 
 Official Fuji TV live-action drama website 
 Official Shojo Beat manga website
 

2003 manga
2005 comics endings
Manga adapted into television series
Romance anime and manga
School life in anime and manga
Shogakukan manga
Shogakukan franchises
Shōjo manga
Viz Media manga
Yuu Watase